Salvia cyclostegia is a perennial plant that is native to forests, grasslands, and hillsides in Sichuan and Yunnan provinces in China, growing at elevations from .

There are two varieties: Salvia cyclostegia var. cyclostegia has a flower that is white, yellowish, or creamy yellow with some grey spotting. Salvia cyclostegia var. purpurascens has a purplish or reddish flower.

References

cyclostegia
Flora of China